"I Got 5 on It" is a mobb music song by American rap duo Luniz featuring R&B singer Michael Marshall, released in May 1995 as the lead single from the duo's debut album, Operation Stackola (1995). The song reached number two in Germany, number three in the United Kingdom and number eight in the United States. It is a drug anthem about the consumption of marijuana; its title and chorus refer to the practice of splitting the cost of a marijuana purchase and claiming five dollars' worth of it. The single was certified Platinum by the RIAA on October 31, 1995 and sold one million copies domestically. 

In 2022, Pitchfork ranked "I Got 5 on It" one of "The 250 Best Songs of the 1990s".

Content
The title relates to the following lyrics:
"Kinda broke this evening, y'all, so all I got's five, I got five"
"Unless you pull out the fat, crispy five-dollar bill on the real before it's history"
"I got 5 on it, let's go half on a sack"

The track is performed by Yukmouth and Numskull, who duet about splitting the cost of a $10 bag of weed before going to a convenience store to buy Tanqueray Gin, Carlo Rossi wine, Arizona brand soft drinks, and a Swisher Sweets cigar to break down and convert into a blunt. The reprised version of the track suggests that the original 'five on it' came from a man who had prepaid Numskull for yet-undelivered cocaine.

The track samples Club Nouveau's "Why You Treat Me So Bad" (1987), Kool and the Gang's "Jungle Boogie" (1973) and Audio Two's "Top Billin'" (1987).

A remix was released that featured Dru Down, E-40, Richie Rich, Shock G, and Spice 1. Warren G makes a cameo in the remix's music video.

Critical reception
Heidi Siegmund Cuda from Los Angeles Times said, "On tracks like “I Got 5 on It”, the two keep their feet so close to East Oakland’s rough streets they’re picking the glass shards off the soles of their shoes." Pan-European magazine Music & Media wrote, "Already a massive smash in the US, this slow rap jam, reminiscent of Warren G's "Regulate", has all the potential to emulate that success elsewhere thanks to a sparse production and an irresistible hook." A reviewer from Music Week gave the song four out of five, describing it as "catchy US hip hop that makes use of the melody from Timex Social Club's mid-Eighties hit "Thinkin' About Ya". Has all the prerequisites to sell well." James Hyman from the RM Dance Update commented, "Just like Jazzy Jeff's infectious 'Summertime', another Kool & The Gang-inspired laid-back 'n' lazy rap is getting heads nodding everywhere."

Pitchfork ranked it one of "The 250 Best Songs of the 1990s" in 2022, commenting, "their lone hit, about going 50-50 on a dime bag, and on paper it’s a celebration of the rituals and etiquette of social smoking. But the musky, nocturnal beat, built from a corroded sample of R&B group Club Nouveau's late '80s hit "Why You Treat Me So Bad", turned the track into an exercise in paranoia."

Track listings
 12" single
A1. "I Got 5 on It" (clean version) – 4:13
A2. "I Got 5 on It" (instrumental) – 4:14
B1. "So Much Drama" (LP version) (street) featuring Nik Nack – 5:14
B2. "So Much Drama" (instrumental) – 5:14

 CD single (US version)
 "I Got 5 on It" (clean short mix) – 3:59
 "I Got 5 on It" (clean bay ballas vocal remix) featuring Dru Down, E-40, Humpty Hump (Shock G), Richie Rich, Shock G, Spice 1 – 4:12
 "I Got 5 on It" (gumbo funk remix) remixed by N.O. Joe (4:50)
 "I Got 5 on It" (clean weedless mix) – 4:12

 Cassette single
A1. "I Got 5 on It" (clean short mix)
A2. "I Got 5 on It" (clean bay ballas vocal remix) featuring Dru Down, E-40, Humpty Hump, Richie Rich, Shock G, Spice 1
A3. "I Got 5 on It" (drop zone rub 1)
A4. "I Got 5 on It" (drop zone rub 2)
B1. "I Got 5 on It" (clean short mix)
B2. "I Got 5 on It" (clean bay ballas vocal remix) featuring Dru Down, E-40, Humpty Hump, Richie Rich (2), Shock G, Spice 1
B3. "I Got 5 on It" (drop zone rub 1)
B4. "I Got 5 on It" (drop zone rub 2)

Charts

Weekly charts

Year-end charts

Certifications

In popular culture
The original song and a suspenseful orchestrated remix version play a crucial role in Jordan Peele's 2019 horror film Us. The track's main melody is used as a leitmotif during the film's climax. The remix is listed on the official soundtrack as the "Tethered Mix". It is also featured in the films Havoc and The Last Black Man in San Francisco. New York Met David Wright had the song as his walk-up music for most of his career because he was number 5 for the team.

See also
List of Dutch Top 40 number-one singles of 1996

References

1994 songs
1995 debut singles
Dutch Top 40 number-one singles
Luniz songs
Songs about cannabis
Songs about drugs